Moses Musonge (born 10 April 1968) is a Ugandan sprinter. He competed in the men's 4 × 100 metres relay at the 1988 Summer Olympics.

References

1968 births
Living people
Athletes (track and field) at the 1988 Summer Olympics
Ugandan male sprinters
Olympic athletes of Uganda
Athletes (track and field) at the 1990 Commonwealth Games
Commonwealth Games competitors for Uganda
Place of birth missing (living people)